Better and Better is a 2013 Chinese romantic comedy film directed by Zhang Yibai and Xie Dongshen and written by Xu Zhengchao, starring Aaron Kwok, Wang Baoqiang, Tong Dawei, Xu Jinglei, Jing Tian, and Sandra Ng. The film premiered in China on 10 February 2013.

Cast

Main cast
Aaron Kwok as Xie Defa
Wang Baoqiang as Sun Guoshu
Tong Dawei as Geng Zhi
Xu Jinglei as Liu Shufen
Jing Tian as Lian Sheng
Sandra Ng as Yuan Fang

Guest appearances
Tony Leung Ka-fai as Chef Zhou
Zhang Yi as Geng Shanxi
Wang Luodan as Zhou Yi'nan
Ni Dahong as Grandpa Geng
Kong Ng as Lao Gengtou
Huang Jue as Xiang Cheng
Zhang Ziyi as herself
Karen Mok
Annie Yi
Christy Chung
Hu Qiaohua
Gao Qunshu
Liu Yiwei
Lam Suet
Wu Mochou
Liu Hua
Max Mok
Liu Zhibing
Wang Zhifei
Zhu Jun
Zhou Tao
Na Wei
Pan Binlong
Zhou Hong
Bowie Lam
Wang Peng
Yue Hong
Zhang Yishan

Music
Eason Chan - Happiness (《稳稳的幸福》)

Critical response
The film received mixed reviews.

References

External links

Chinese romantic comedy films
2013 romantic comedy films